The 2019 African U20 Championships in Athletics was the fourteenth edition of the biennial, continental athletics tournament for African athletes aged 19 years or younger, for the first time held jointly with the African U18 Championships in Athletics. It was held at the Stade Félix Houphouët-Boigny in Abidjan, Ivory Coast, between 16 and 20 April.

Medal table

Medal summary

Men (U20)

Women (U20)

Boys (U18)

Girls (U18)

References

Results
U20 results at AfricAthle
U18 results at AfricAthle
Results at Tilastopaja

African Junior Athletics Championships
African U18 and U20 Championships in Athletics
African U18 and U20 Championships in Athletics
Junior Athletics Championships
African U20 Championships in Athletics
African U18 and U20 Championships in Athletics